The 2018 Armagh Senior Football Championship is the 118th edition of Armagh GAA's premier gaelic football tournament for senior clubs in County Armagh, Northern Ireland. The winners represent Armagh in the Ulster Senior Club Football Championship.

The championship begins with sixteen teams competing in four groups of four teams before proceeding to a knock-out format. Prior to 2018 the competition had a back-door format. The winners receive the Gerry Fegan Cup.

Armagh Harps were the defending champions after they defeated Maghery Seán McDermott's in the 2017 final.

This was Killeavy St. Moninna's and Silverbridge Harps' return to the senior grade after they claimed the 2017 I.F.C. and I.A.F.L. titles respectively.

Whitecross St. Killian's and Tír na nÓg Portadown were relegated to the I.F.C. and I.A.F.L. for 2019 after they finished 7th and 8th in the S.B.F.L. respectively. They will be replaced by the I.F.C. & I.A.F.L. champions Lurgan St. Peter's as well as I.A.F.L. runners-up Culloville Blues. 

Crossmaglen Rangers claimed their 44th S.F.C. title and their 20th in 23 years when defeating Ballymacnab 0-24 to 1-15 in the decider at the Athletic Grounds on 21 October 2018.

Team Changes

The following teams have changed division since the 2017 championship season.

Promoted To S.F.C. from I.F.C.

 Killeavy St Moninna's  -  (IFC Champions)
 Silverbridge Harps - (IAFL Champions)

Relegated to I.F.C. from S.F.C.
 Cullaville Blues - (7th SBFL)
 Wolfe Tones - (8th SBFL)

Group stage
All 16 teams enter the competition at this stage. The top 2 teams in each group go into the quarter-finals while the bottom team of each group enter the relegation playoffs. The team named first in each round listed below received home advantage.

Group A

Round 1
 Whitecross 0-7, 1-13 Dromintee, 24/8/2018,
 Sarsfields 1-11, 3-14 Ballymacnab, 25/8/2018,

Round 2
 Whitecorss 0-2, 5-17 Ballymacnab, 31/8/2018,
 Dromintee 2-16, 1-14 Sarsfields, 1/9/2018,

Round 3
 Sarsfields 3-17, 1-7 Whitecross, 8/9/2018,
 Ballymacnab 2-14, 2-9 Dromintee, 8/9/2018,

Group B

Round 1
 Silverbridge 0-11, 0-12 Crossmaglen, 24/8/2018,
 Madden 2-12, 4-12 Clann Éireann, 25/8/2018,

Round 2
 Clann Éireann 0-10, 1-15 Silverbridge, 1/9/2018,
 Madden 2-15, 2-16 Crossmaglen, 1/9/2018,

Round 3
 Silverbridge 0-10, 1-9 Madden, 8/9/2018,
 Crossmaglen 4-15, 0-7 Clann Éireann, 8/9/2018,

Group C

Round 1
 Annaghmore 0-8, 0-16 Armagh Harps, 24/8/2018,
 Killeavy 0-6, 2-14 Maghery, 25/8/2018,

Round 2
 Annaghmore 0-12, 1-9 Maghery, 31/8/2018,
 Armagh Harps 3-10, 1-14 Killeavy, 1/9/2018,

Round 3
 Maghery 0-12, 0-11 Armagh Harps, 9/9/2018,
 Killeavy 0-9, 0-6 Annaghmore, 9/9/2018,

Group D

Round 1
 Tír na nÓg 0-5, 1-12 Granemore, 24/8/2018,
 Pearse Óg 2-11, 3-16 Cullyhanna, 25/8/2018,

Round 2
 Granemore 0-15, 2-16 Pearse Óg, 31/8/2018,
 Tír na nÓg 0-7,2-18 Cullyhanna, 1/9/2018,

Round 3
 Pearse Óg 2-12, 0-10 Tír na nÓg, 9/9/2018,
 Cullyhanna 3-17, 0-7 Granemore, 9/9/2018

Knock-Out Stage

Last Eight

Quarter-finals

Semi-finals

Final

All-Ireland Senior Club Football Championship

References

External links

Armagh Senior Football Championship
Armagh Senior Football Championship
Armagh SFC